The old Rathaus (in German: Altes Rathaus) is the former town hall in the centre of the city of Oldenburg, Lower Saxony, Germany.

In 1635, a Renaissance-style town hall was built on this site by Count Anthony Günther. It was removed in 1886 and the present building was completed in 1888 with elements of the neo-Renaissance and neo-Gothic styles. There is a German restaurant in the basement, the Ratskeller Oldenburg.

To the south is St Lamberti-Kirche and to the west is Oldenburgisches Staatstheater.

See also
 List of visitor attractions in Oldenburg

References

External links

 360° panorama by the Rathaus

1635 establishments in the Holy Roman Empire
1886 disestablishments in Germany
Buildings and structures completed in 1888
Buildings and structures in Oldenburg (city)
Tourist attractions in Oldenburg (city)
Former seats of local government
City and town halls in Germany
Renaissance architecture in Germany
Gothic architecture in Germany